The Putidjara are an Aboriginal Australian people of the Pilbara region of Western Australia.

Country
They were to be found south of Lake George, and east to Kolajuru, and beyond the southeast of Kumpupintil Lake, latterly at Mendel in the direction of the Hutton Range. The frontier with the Mandjildjara lay at Tjundutjundu well on the Canning Stock Route. When drought struck they would press south to Kadidi near Lake Augusta, and the moon totem (raga)soak called Tjangara. Their most southerly boundary was at Pulburumal, the twelfth waterhole on the Canning Stock Route. Their border with the Kartudjara was at Lawulawu (Canning Stock Route Well 16).

Alternative names
 Potitjara, Putitjara
 Budidjara, Bududjara
 Purditara
 Pawutudjara
 Paodudjara
 Patudja
 Patudjara
 Partutudjara
 Bawndudjara
 Partutu (lake people)
 Ngondidjara (Kartudjara exonym)
 Kaltalbudara
 Kaltalbudjara
 Kaltalbudjira
 Poroko (Kokatja exonym)
 Barduwonga
 Badu, Pardu(?)
 Tutudjara

Notes

Citations

Sources

Aboriginal peoples of Western Australia
Canning Stock Route
Mid West (Western Australia)